Benjamin "Ben" Acheampong (2 February 1939 – 2019), also known as Ben Simmons, was a Ghanaian international football player. As a player, he won the 1963 and 1965 African Cup of Nations titles with Ghana under the tutelage of Charles Gyamfi. He tied for top-scoring honors in the 1965 competition with three goals.

References

External links 
 

1939 births
2019 deaths
Ghanaian footballers
Ghana international footballers
Olympic footballers of Ghana
Footballers at the 1964 Summer Olympics
1963 African Cup of Nations players
1965 African Cup of Nations players
Africa Cup of Nations-winning players
Asante Kotoko S.C. players
Association football defenders